Ten United States presidents have made presidential visits to the Middle East. The first trips by an incumbent president to countries in (or partly within) the Middle East were those of Franklin D. Roosevelt, and were an offshoot of Allied diplomatic interactions during World War II. To date, 16 visits have been made to Egypt, 12 to Saudi Arabia, 11 to Israel, six to both Iraq, Jordan and Turkey, four to Iran, three to the Palestinian Territories, two to both Kuwait and Syria, one to Bahrain, Georgia, Oman, Qatar, and to the United Arab Emirates. No incumbent American president has yet visited Armenia, Azerbaijan, Cyprus, Lebanon, and Yemen.

Table of visits

Visits by former presidents
Ulysses S. Grant visited Alexandria, Egypt, met with Khedive Isma'il Pasha, sailed up the Nile to tour the Valley of the Kings, and travelled by train down the length of the Suez Canal in 1878, during a post-presidency world tour. During the same tour, he visited Jerusalem.
Richard Nixon (without official State Department credentials) attended the funeral of Mohammad Reza Pahlavi, former Shah of Iran, in Cairo, Egypt, March 8, 1980.
Richard Nixon, Gerald Ford and Jimmy Carter were among the dignitaries representing the United States at the funeral of Egyptian President Sadat in Cairo, October 10, 1981.
Gerald Ford, Jimmy Carter, and George H. W. Bush attended the state funeral of King Hussein of Jordan in Amman, February 8, 1999.
Bill Clinton attended the state funeral of former Israeli President Shimon Peres in Jerusalem, September 30, 2016.

See also
 United States foreign policy in the Middle East
 United States Special Envoy to the Organisation of Islamic Cooperation
 Middle East Policy Council

References

Bahrain–United States relations
Egypt–United States relations
Israel–United States relations
Turkey–United States relations
Jordan–United States relations
Iran–United States relations
Kuwait–United States relations
Iraq–United States relations
Oman–United States relations
Syria–United States relations
United Arab Emirates–United States relations
Qatar–United States relations
Saudi Arabia–United States relations
Armenia–United States relations
Azerbaijan–United States relations
Georgia (country)–United States relations
State of Palestine–United States relations
Lists of United States presidential visits
Politics of World War II